"Waiting For My Chance to Come" is a song by English folk band Noah and the Whale. The single served as the fourth single from the band's third studio album, Last Night on Earth. The single was released in the United Kingdom on 12 September 2011. It has so far peaked to number 185 on the UK Singles Chart.

Music video
The music video for the song appeared on their YouTube channel on 12 September 2011. It features the band playing on a red lightship in the pool of London on the Thames, visibly across from The O2. Throughout the video the Union Jack is used with Charlie Fink wearing a set of Union Jack socks and showing shots of the band with Fink draped in Union Jack bunting.

Track listing

Chart performance

Credits and personnel
Lead vocals – Noah and the Whale
Producers – Charlie Fink, Jason Lader
Lyrics –  Charlie Fink
Label: Mercury Records

References

2011 singles
Mercury Records singles
Noah and the Whale songs
2011 songs